Where Forever Begins is the second studio album by American country music artist Ken Mellons. Released in 1995 on Epic Records, it contains the singles "Rub-a-Dubbin'" and "Stranger in Your Eyes". The first two singles were both #39 hits on the Billboard country charts in 1995. "Stranger in Your Eyes" was originally recorded by Joe Diffie on his 1990 album, A Thousand Winding Roads.  "He Ain't Even Cold Yet" was later recorded by Gretchen Wilson on her 2005 album All Jacked Up.

Track listing

Personnel
 Bobby All - acoustic guitar
 John Anderson - vocals on "He'll Never Be a Lawyer"
 Allen Frizzell - background vocals
 John Hobbs - piano
 Richard Hughes - jews harp
 John Hughey - steel guitar, dobro
 Carl Jackson - background vocals
 George Jones - vocals on "He'll Never Be a Lawyer"
 Joe Khoury - acoustic guitar
 Paul Leim- drums
 Ken Mellons - lead vocals
 Al Perkins - dobro
 Tom Robb - bass guitar
 Brent Rowan - electric guitar
 John Wesley Ryles - background vocals
 Hank Singer - fiddle, mandolin
 Milton Sledge - drums
 Billy Smith - background vocals
 Terry Smith - background vocals
 Jamie Whiting - piano
 Dennis Wilson - background vocals
 Reggie Young - electric guitar

References
Allmusic (see infobox)

1995 albums
Epic Records albums
Ken Mellons albums